The 2011 Grand Prix Cycliste de Montréal was the second edition of the Grand Prix Cycliste de Montréal, a single-day professional bicycle road race. It was the 25th event of the 2011 UCI World Tour season.

 rider Rui Costa won the race, having attacked on the final climb of Mont Royal with several other riders and stayed away until the end, winning the sprint for the line ahead of 's Pierrick Fédrigo. The other rider in the breakaway, Stefan Denifl of  faded in the closing stages to fifth place in the results behind the  pair of Philippe Gilbert and Jürgen Roelandts.

Course

The race consisted of 17 laps of a circuit  in length, an increase of one lap from the 2010 running of the race. The circuit, around the main campus of the Université de Montréal, was well-suited for climbers, with three climbs per lap, and those who are used to steep descents. The finish was on an uphill climb, that was located on Avenue du Parc.

Teams
As the race was held under the auspices of the UCI World Tour, all eighteen ProTour teams were invited automatically.

The 22 teams invited to the race were:

Results

References

2011
2011 UCI World Tour
Grand Prix Cycliste de Montrea
2011 in Quebec
September 2011 sports events in Canada